United Nations Security Council Resolution 357, adopted unanimously on 14 August 1974, after reaffirming previous resolutions on the topic, the Council demanded that all parties present to the fighting in Cyprus cease all firing and military action. It called for the resumption of negotiations and decided to remain seized of the situation and on instant call to meet as necessary to consider what more effective measures may be required should the cease-fire fail.

See also
 Cyprus dispute
 List of United Nations Security Council Resolutions 301 to 400 (1971–1976)
 Turkish invasion of Cyprus

References
Text of the Resolution at undocs.org

External links
 

 0357
 0357
Turkish invasion of Cyprus
 0357
August 1974 events